The 2011 Tour de France was the 98th edition of the race, one of cycling's Grand Tours. It featured 22 cycling teams. Eighteen of the teams invited to the Tour were a part of the UCI World Tour, the other four teams are French Professional Continental teams. The Tour began with a stage from Passage du Gois to Mont des Alouettes on 2 July and finished on the Champs-Élysées in Paris on 24 July. Eighteen UCI World Tour teams have been invited and are obligated to participate in the 2011 Tour de France. 198 riders from 22 teams started the race at Passage du Gois. 167 of them completed the race at Champs-Élysées.

Teams

UCI ProTeams

UCI Professional Continental teams

Cyclists

By rider

By nationality

References

 
2011